Eschdorf is a small town in the commune of Esch-sur-Sûre, in north-western Luxembourg.  , the town had a population of 411.  It is the commune of Esch-sur-Sûre's administrative centre.

References 

Towns in Luxembourg
Wiltz (canton)